Eyelid Movies is the debut studio album by American electronic music duo Phantogram, released on 9 February 2010 by Barsuk Records. On 7 October 2022, Barsuk Records announced that a reissue of the album including previously unreleased songs would be released on 11 November.

Reception

The album was generally well received, retaining a rating of 76 out of 100 on the review aggregating site Metacritic based on 13 reviews. Absolute Punk gave a favorable review, stating, "Phantogram have put forth a collection of heady and stimulating songs primed for in-the-dark listening." However, another review from Prefix magazine gave it a 5.5 out of 10, recognizing the band's potential for making good music, but saying that the debut was "something of a stumble out of the gate." BBC Music gave it an 8 out of 10.

Track listing

Standard edition

2022 expanded edition

References 

2010 debut albums
Phantogram (band) albums
Barsuk Records albums